Polygala tatarinowii is a species of flowering plant in the milkwort family (Polygalaceae). It is native to China, Japan, Korea, Russia, Myanmar, the Philippines, Taiwan, and Vietnam.

References

tatarinowii
Flora of China
Flora of Japan
Flora of Korea
Flora of Russia
Flora of Myanmar
Flora of the Philippines
Flora of Taiwan
Flora of Vietnam